Sir Terence Orby Conran  (4 October 1931 – 12 September 2020) was an English designer, restaurateur, retailer and writer. He founded the Design Museum in  Shad Thames, London in 1989 The British designer Thomas Heatherwick said that Conran "moved Britain forward to make it an influence around the world." Edward Barber, from the British design team Barber & Osgerby, described Conran as "the most passionate man in Britain when it comes to design, and his central idea has always been 'Design is there to improve your life.'" The satirist Craig Brown once joked that before Conran "there were no chairs and no France."

Early life and education
Conran was born in Kingston upon Thames, the son of Christina Mabel Joan Conran (née Halstead, d.1968) and South African-born Gerard Rupert Conran (d.1986), a businessman who owned a rubber importation company in East London. Conran was educated at Highfield School in Liphook, Bryanston School in Dorset and the Central School of Art and Design (now incorporated into Central St Martin's, a part of the University of the Arts, London), where he studied textiles and other materials.

Work
Conran's first professional work came when he worked in the Festival of Britain (1951) on the main South Bank site. He left college to take up a job with Dennis Lennon's architectural company, which had been commissioned to make a 1/4-scale interior of a Princess Flying Boat.

Conran started his own design practice in 1956 with the Summa furniture range and designing a shop for Mary Quant.

In 1964, he opened the first Habitat shop in Chelsea, London with his third wife Caroline Herbert, focusing on housewares and furniture in contemporary designs. Habitat grew into a large chain, the first retailer to bring such designs to a mass audience.

In the mid-1980s, Conran expanded Habitat into the Storehouse plc group of companies that included BhS, Mothercare and Heal's but in 1990 he lost control of the company.

His later retail companies included the Conran Shop and FSC-certified (Forest Stewardship Council) wood furniture maker Benchmark Furniture, which he co-founded with Sean Sutcliffe in 1983.

He was also involved in architecture and interior design, including establishing the architecture and planning consultancy Conran Roche with Fred Roche in 1980. Their projects include Michelin House (which he turned into the restaurant Bibendum) and the Bluebird Garage, both in Chelsea. Conran had a major role in the regeneration in the early 1990s of the Shad Thames area of London next to Tower Bridge that includes the Design Museum. His business, Conran and Partners, is a design company comprising product, brand and interior designers and architects, working on projects all over the world. Conran designed furniture for Marks & Spencer, J. C. Penney, Content by Conran, Benchmark, and The Conran Shop.

Conran's architecture and design practice also worked on projects in North America and Asia. In 2009, he licensed the Conran Shop to a partner in Japan. In September 2014, Cassina IXC Ltd acquired the entire business of The Conran Shop in Japan where it still thrives with four stores. In 2019, the Conran Shop opened in Seoul, South Korea.

In 1997 he appeared as himself in “In the Smoke”,  S5:E7 of Pie in the Sky.

Restaurants

Besides Bibendum, Conran created many other restaurants in London and elsewhere. In 2005, he was named as the most influential restaurateur in the UK by CatererSearch, the website of Caterer and Hotelkeeper magazine. In 2007, 49 percent of the restaurant business was sold to two former managers, who rebranded it as D&D London.

In 2008, he returned to the restaurant business on a personal basis by opening Boundary, a restaurant, bar, café, and meeting room complex in Shoreditch, East London. This was followed in 2009 by Lutyens, a restaurant and private club within the former Reuters building in Fleet Street London. In 2018, Lutyens, together with two other related restaurants, closed as Conran's hospitality venture with Peter Prescott went into administration.

Books
He wrote over 50 books which broadly reflect his design philosophy,  The majority of these books were published by Conran Octopus, a division of Octopus Publishing Group, a cross-platform illustrated-book publisher founded by Conran and Paul Hamlyn.

Honours and awards
Conran was appointed Knight Bachelor in the 1983 New Year Honours and Companion of Honour (CH) in the 2017 Birthday Honours for services to design.

He was a winner of the Chartered Society of Designers Minerva Medal, the society's highest award.

Between 2003 and 2011, Conran was provost of the Royal College of Art.

In 2003, he received the Prince Philip Designers Prize in recognition of his lifetime achievements in design.

In 2010, Conran was appointed a Royal Designer for Industry by the Royal Society of Arts.

He won the Lifetime Achievement Award at The Catey Awards in 2017.

In 2019, Conran was presented with a Lifetime Achievement Award by The Furniture Makers’ Company, the City of London livery company and charity for the furnishing industry.

Academic honours
In 2007, he received an honorary degree from London South Bank University and, in August 2012, an honorary doctorate from the University of Pretoria.

In May 2012, he received an honorary professorship from the University for the Creative Arts.

Personal life
Conran married architect Brenda Davison in 1952 at the age of 19; the marriage lasted six months. Conran married his second wife, journalist Shirley Pearce, in 1955 with whom he had two sons – Sebastian and Jasper – before they divorced in 1962. Conran married his third wife, cookery writer Caroline Herbert, the following year. The marriage lasted for 33 years and produced three children – Tom, Sophie, and Edmund – before ending in divorce in 1996. Conran married his fourth wife, Victoria Davis, in 2000.

Death
Sir Terence Conran died on 12 September 2020, at the age of 88.

Bibliography

 The House Book. Pub. Mitchell Beazley, 1974. .
 The Kitchen Book. Crown Publishers, 1977.
 The Bed and Bath Book. Crown Publishers, 1978. .
 The Cook Book. with Caroline Conran. Crown Publishers, 1980. ,.
 The Vegetable Book. Crescent, 1984. .
 Terence Conran's New House book. Villard Books, 1985. .
 Terence Conran's plants at home. with Susan Conder. Conran Octopus, 1986. .
 Terence Conran's France. with Pierrette Pompon Bailhache, Maurice Croizard. Little, Brown, 1987. .
 Terence Conran's Home Furnishings. 1987. .
 Terence Conran's do-it-yourself with style. Simon & Schuster, 1989. .
 Tableware. with Jeremy Myerson, Sylvia Katz. Pub. Van Nostrand Reinhold, 1990.
 Conran's Decorating with Plants. Smithmark Pub, 1990. .
 Terence Conran's garden style, with John McGowan. Ed. Roger DuBern. Crown Publishers, 1991. .
 The Soft furnishings book. Conran Octopus, 1995.
 The French Room: Simple French Style for Your Home. with 	Elizabeth Wilhide. Conran Octopus, 1995. .
 Terence Conran on design. Conran Octopus, 1996. .
 The Essential Garden Book (Co-authored with Dan Pearson), Three Rivers Press, 1998. .
 Terence Conran's Easy Living. Soma Books, 1999. .
 Terence Conran on restaurants. Overlook Press, 2000. .
 Terence Conran Small Spaces. Clarkson N Potter Publishers, 2001. .
 Kitchens: the hub of the home. Clarkson Potter/Publishers, 2002. .
 Bathrooms: just add water. Conran Octopus, 2004. .
 Designers on Design. with Max Fraser. Collins Design, 2005. .
 The Ultimate House Book: For Home Design in the Twenty-First Century. Ed.	Elizabeth Wilhide. Pub. Conran Octopus, 2006. .
 The Conran Cookbook.  with Simon Hopkinson, Caroline Conran. Conran Octopus, 2007. .
 How to live in small spaces: design, furnishing, decoration, detail for the smaller home. Pub. Conran Octopus, 2007. .
 Storage: Get Organized. Conran Octopus, 2007. .
 Chef's Garden: Fresh Produce from Small Spaces. Conran Octopus, 2008. ,.
 Terence Conran's Inspiration. with Stafford Cliff. Conran Octopus, 2009. .
 Essential Colour. Conran Octopus Publishing, London 2011, .
 new edition Eco House Book. Conran Octopus Publishing, London 2012, .
 Plain, Simple, Useful: The Essence of Conran Style. Conran Octopus Publishing, London 2014, .

Biographies
 Terence Conran. by Nicholas Ind. Sidgwick & Jackson, 1996. .
 Terence Conran: Design and the Quality of Life by Elizabeth Wilhide. Watson-Guptill, 1999.
 'Conran and the Habitat story' by Barty Phillips.

See also

 List of alumni of the Central School of Art and Design
 List of English writers
 List of restaurateurs

References

External links

 Conran.com
 Terence Conran profile on CatererSearch
 Interview with Sir Terence Conran on new Design Museum – LUX Magazine 2013
 Terence Conran interviewed by Ginny Dougary (2005)
 
 The Brits Who Designed the Modern World Artsnight - Series 4: 7, BBC Two
 Obituary by Stephen Bayley, 12 Sep 2020
 The transformation of London dining in the 1980s and 1990s
 

1931 births
2020 deaths
20th-century British artists
20th-century British businesspeople
20th-century English non-fiction writers
21st-century British artists
21st-century British businesspeople
21st-century English writers
Alumni of the Central School of Art and Design
British retail company founders
Businesspeople from London
Chartered designers
Terence
English businesspeople in retailing
English company founders
English industrial designers
English interior designers
Industrial design
English male non-fiction writers
English non-fiction writers
English restaurateurs
Fellows of Chartered Society of Designers
Knights Bachelor
Members of the Order of the Companions of Honour
Compasso d'Oro Award recipients
People associated with the Royal College of Art
People educated at Bryanston School
People from Chelsea, London
People from Esher
People from Kingston upon Thames
People from Kintbury
Product designers
Restaurant founders
Writers from London
English republicans